FedEx Express Flight 80 was a scheduled cargo flight from Guangzhou Baiyun International Airport in the People's Republic of China, to Narita International Airport in Narita, Chiba Prefecture (near Tokyo), Japan. On March 23, 2009,  the McDonnell Douglas MD-11F (N526FE) operating the flight crashed at 6:48 am JST (21:48 UTC, March 22), while attempting a landing on Runway 34L in gusty wind conditions. The aircraft became destabilized at flare and touchdown resulting in an unrecovered "bounced" landing with structural failure of the landing gear and airframe, and came to rest off the runway, inverted, and burning fiercely.  The captain and first officer, the jet's only occupants, were both killed.

Accident 
After making an approximately  overnight flight from Guangzhou, China, the aircrew made an early morning approach to Narita Airport outside Tokyo. Other traffic landing just ahead of the accident aircraft reported "wind shear at an altitude of under ," and this information was relayed to the FedEx aircrew. After making a hard landing on runway 34L, the plane bounced three times, coming back down on its nose gear first (a condition called "porpoising") resulting in the loss of directional and altitudinal control. The left wing struck the ground as the gear failed, causing the aircraft to veer to the left, burst into flames and invert as the airframe broke up, and came to rest upside down in the grass to the left of the runway. It took firefighters about two hours to extinguish the blaze, which completely destroyed the aircraft and its contents.

Fatalities 
The only people on board the aircraft were the Captain, Kevin Kyle Mosley, 54, of Hillsboro, Oregon, and First Officer Anthony Stephen Pino, 49, of San Antonio, Texas. Both pilots were removed to the Japanese Red Cross Narita Hospital (成田赤十字病院 Narita Seki Jūji Byōin) where they were pronounced dead.  Captain Mosley, a former United States Marine Corps fighter pilot, had been with FedEx Express since July 1, 1996 and had accumulated more than 12,800 total career flight hours, including 3,648 hours on the MD-11. First Officer Pino, a former C-5 Galaxy pilot in the United States Air Force, joined FedEx Express in 2006 and had accumulated more than 6,300 total career flight hours, 879 of them on the MD-11. Nobody on the ground was injured.

Runway closure 
Runway 16R/34L (length ) was closed for many hours after the accident (with passenger flight cancellations or delays), leaving the shorter 16L/34R as the only available active runway. As a result, many flights operated by larger aircraft had to be canceled or diverted to other airports such as nearby Haneda Airport, as 16L/34R is too short (length ) for some types to operate safely, and some large aircraft types such as Boeing 777-300ER and Airbus A340-600 are restricted from using taxiway "B" (Bravo) which services that runway because of inadequate horizontal clearances.

Aircraft history 

The aircraft was built in 1994 as an MD-11 passenger airliner. It was acquired temporarily by NASA to use as the test bed for their Propulsion-Controlled Aircraft system (PCA) in 1995. Later it was owned and operated by Delta Air Lines from 1996 to 2004 under the FAA registration N813DE in such configuration.  The trijet was sold to FedEx in October 2004 when Delta retired its MD-11 fleet in favor of switching to more-efficient twin-engine Boeing 767s and Boeing 777s on its long-haul routes. Following its acquisition by FedEx, the plane was stored at Phoenix Goodyear Airport in Goodyear, Arizona pending its conversion there to an MD-11F by Dimension Aviation, Inc., Boeing's Douglas Products Division airframe conversion contractor located at that field. The aircraft entered service with FedEx in its all-cargo configuration in late 2006 as N526FE. It was powered by three Pratt & Whitney PW4462 engines.

Cause 

The Japan Transport Safety Board (JTSB) dispatched six investigators to the airport. The United States's National Transportation Safety Board (NTSB) sent a team to Japan to assist with the investigation. The crash was FedEx's second fatal accident involving a jet aircraft, following the loss of a FedEx owned B747-249F that crashed February 18, 1989, near Kuala Lumpur, while still painted in the Flying Tigers livery after the acquisition of the Flying Tigers Line by FedEx in December 1988.  This was the first fatal accident at Narita Airport.

The accident was attributed by the JTSB to a series of "porpoising oscillations" that developed during touchdown, following a high sink rate during the final approach.   The first officer executed a late flare, in which sink rate was not suppressed until the plane was nearly on the runway, but which also would minimize "float" that might carry the plane further down the runway and reduce its safe stopping distance, or carry it off the centerline in the existing crosswinds.  This high touchdown sink rate, coupled with large nose-up inputs, caused the first bounce.   A large nose-down input was applied, causing a touchdown on the nose gear.  This deviates from approved procedures for the MD-11 during a bounce, which specifies the pilot is to hold a pitch angle of 7.5 deg and use thrust to adjust the descent rate.  The plane bounced off this second touchdown, pitching upward.  The large control inputs by the first officer resulted in a hard touchdown on the main landing gear.  This final touchdown was hard enough to cause the left wing to fail as the left main landing gear transferred force up into the wing, exceeding its design limit.  The JTSB report suggested the fire might have been averted if the landing gear fuse pin had failed as designed, but that much of the touchdown force was horizontal to the pin rather than vertical, keeping it intact.  The report also cited the crew's use of autothrottle during landing despite gusty wind conditions.

As a result of this accident the Japan Transport Safety Board published its final report on April 26, 2013, in which it made a number of new safety recommendations including that "in order to reduce the occurrence of MD-11 series airplanes' severe hard landing and bounce in which an overload is transferred to the MLGs and their supporting structure, the Boeing Company should improve the controllability and maneuver characteristics by improving the LSAS (Longitudinal Stability Augmentation System) functions, reducing the AGS (Auto Ground Spoilers) deployment delay time and other possible means. Possible improvement on LSAS functions may include: a function to limit large nose-down elevator input during touchdown phase, which is a common phenomenon in severe hard landing cases accompanied by structural destruction for MD-11; and a function to assist bounce recovery and go-around in case of bounce. In order to help pilots to conduct recovery operation from large bounces and judge the necessity of go-around, studies should be made to install a visual display and an aural warning system which show gear touchdown status on MD-11 series airplanes."

Similar FedEx MD-11F accident 

On July 31, 1997, another FedEx MD-11F (N611FE), operating as FedEx Express Flight 14, was written off after a similar destabilized landing accident at Newark Liberty International Airport. After a flight from Anchorage, Alaska, that aircraft crashed at the airport just before midnight when it bounced twice after a hard touchdown on Runway 22R, resulting in the failure of the right main landing gear. As in the Narita accident, the plane also caught fire as the airframe broke up, flipped over, and came to rest inverted off the runway. The captain, first officer, and three passengers on board all survived the 1997 Newark crash and were able to escape from the burning aircraft with only minor injuries.

In popular media 
The crashes of both FedEx Express Flights 80 and 14 were covered on Season 14 of Mayday (Air Crash Investigation), episode 5 (episode 114 overall), titled The Final Push.

See also 

 Lufthansa Cargo Flight 8460 – an MD-11 that bounced and broke up on landing in 2010
 China Airlines Flight 642 – an MD-11 that landed hard and broke up in 1999
 FedEx Express Flight 14 – an MD-11 that bounced and flipped on landing in 1997
 List of accidents and incidents involving commercial aircraft

References

External links 

 Japan Transport Safety Board
 Final report (Archive)
  Final report (Archive)
 Interim Report (Archive)
  Interim Report (Archive)
 FedEx
 "FedEx Express Releases Additional Information Regarding FedEx Express Flight 80" (Archive)
  フェデックス航空機の事故について - お詫び (Archive)
Unrecovered "bounced" landing at flightsafety.org
 (from the Associated Press)

Accidents and incidents involving the McDonnell Douglas MD-11
Aviation accidents and incidents in 2009
FedEx
80
Aviation accidents and incidents in Japan
Narita International Airport
March 2009 events in Japan
Accidents and incidents involving cargo aircraft